Romuald Lacazette (born 3 January 1994) is a French professional footballer who plays as a midfielder for Tiroler Liga club Wacker Innsbruck.

Personal life
Lacazette was born in Paris on 3 January 1994. His cousin is the Arsenal striker Alexandre Lacazette.

Career

Early career
He played for Paris Saint-Germain, joining its youth team in 2012. He then played for PSG II for the whole season. Despite receiving a call up to the first team, he could not feature for them.

TSV 1860 Munich
Lacazette was transferred to 1860 Munich on 18 July 2015. During the 2015–16 season, he scored two goals in three matches played for the reserve team and made nine appearances the first team. He made his first team debut in a 3–0 loss to SC Freiburg on 20 December 2015. On 20 March 2016, Lacazette received a red card against Arminia Bielefeld in a 1–1 draw.

Darmstadt 98
Lacazette joined Darmstadt 98 from 1860 Munich on a three-year contract until 2020.

On 31 August 2018, Lacazette returned to 1860 Munich on loan until the end of the 2018–19 season.

Villefranche
After a season without a club, Lacazette joined French Championnat National side FC Villefranche in July 2020.

TSV Wasserburg
In the summer of 2021, he joined German fifth-tier Bayernliga club TSV Wasserburg in his wife's hometown to maintain shape, without signing with the club. In November 2021, he officially joined the team.

Career statistics

References

1994 births
Footballers from Paris
French footballers
French expatriate footballers
Guadeloupean expatriate footballers
Guadeloupean footballers
Expatriate footballers in Germany
French expatriate sportspeople in Germany
2. Bundesliga players
Championnat National players
Championnat National 2 players
TSV 1860 Munich II players
TSV 1860 Munich players
FC Villefranche Beaujolais players
Living people
Association football midfielders
SV Darmstadt 98 players
3. Liga players
Bayernliga players
Grand-Lancy FC players
FC Wacker Innsbruck (2002) players
Expatriate footballers in Austria
French expatriate sportspeople in Austria